Reato is an Italian surname. Notable people with the surname include:

Fabio Reato (born 1993), Italian footballer
Tommaso Reato (born 1984), Italian rugby union player

See also
Reto

Italian-language surnames